Fjellhamar Fotballklubb is a Norwegian association football club from Fjellhamar in Lørenskog.

It was founded in 1976. The men's football team currently plays in the Third Division, the fourth tier of Norwegian football. Fjellhamar stadium is their home field and they also have the disposal of Torshov stadion. The team colors are white and red(white shirts, red shorts, red socks).

Its most notable former player is Abdisalam Ibrahim.

References

External links
 Official site 

Football clubs in Norway
Sport in Akershus
Association football clubs established in 1976
Lørenskog
1976 establishments in Norway